Lisa Ingall is an English snooker player. She was runner-up in the 2000 World Women's Snooker Championship.

Biography
Ingall started playing snooker at the age of 12, and by the age of 16 was practicing four hours a day after school, and for sixteen hours at weekends. She had experienced bullying at school, and transferred to Bromfords Secondary School in Wickford, where she did not have any problems with being bullied. In 1995 and 1996 she played on the girls' snooker circuit, winning four of the seven events and coming second in the other three, to leave her as the top ranked girl player. At the age of 16, and with the endorsement of her parents, she decided to become a professional snooker player, and did not take her GCSEs. She was named as the World Ladies Billiards and Snooker Association Young Junior Player of the year in 1996.

In 2000, Ingall reached the semi-final of the UK Women's championship, losing 0–4 to Kelly Fisher A few months later, she reached her first ranking final, winning past Eva Palmius 4–0, Mary Talbot 4–1, Lisa Quick 4–2, and Sharon Dickson 4–2, to meet Kelly Fisher in the final of the World Ladies Snooker Championship. Ingall won the second  to level at 1–1 before Fisher won the last three frames to take the match 4–1. Ingall received £2,500 as runner up.

In 2002, Ingall and Kelly Fisher, representing England, won the Home International Series, with 6–0 wins over Northern Ireland, Guernsey, Wales and Scotland 6–0 and a 5–1 win over the Republic of Ireland. They also won the International Challenge, beating both Poland and France 6–0 in qualifying and Wales 4–1 in the final.

Titles and achievements

2002 Home International Series – champion, with Kelly Fisher
2002 International Challenge – champion, with Kelly Fisher

References

Female snooker players
English snooker players
1977 births
Living people